HFN may refer to:

 Hertford North railway station, in England
 Herzog, Fox & Ne'eman, an Israeli law firm
 Hornafjörður Airport, serving Höfn, Iceland
 Huu-ay-aht First Nations, based on Vancouver Island, Canada